The 2019 Nigerian Senate election in Edo State was held on February 23, 2019, to elect members of the Nigerian Senate to represent Edo State. Ordia Akhimienmona Clifford, representing Edo Central, and Urghide Mathew Aisagbonriodion, representing Edo South, won on the Peoples Democratic Party platform. Alimikhena Francis Asekhame, representing Edo North, won on the All Progressives Congress platform.

Overview & Summary

Results

Edo Central 
A total of 11 candidates registered with the Independent National Electoral Commission to enter the election. PDP candidate Ordia Akhimienmona Clifford won the election, defeating APC candidates and 10 other party candidates. Clifford received 52.86% of the votes, while Osagie received 46.36%.

Edo South 
A total of 12 candidates registered with the Independent National Electoral Commission to enter the election. PDP candidate Urghide Mathew Aisagbonriodion won the election, defeating APC candidate Obahiagbon Patrick and 10 other party candidates. Aisagbonriodion received 51.03% of the votes, while Obahiagbon Patrick received 45.90%.

Edo North 
A total of 10 candidates registered with the Independent National Electoral Commission to enter the election. APC candidate Alimikhena Francis Asekhame won the election, defeating PDP candidate Momoh Abubakar Eshiokpekha and 8 other party candidates. Asekhame received 58.98% of the votes, while Eshiokpekha received 40.44%.

References 

Edo State
Edo State Senate elections